Nasal septal abscess is a condition of the nasal septum in which there is a collection of pus between the mucoperichondrium and septal cartilage.

Signs and symptoms
Individuals with this condition may also have fever, general malaise and nasal pain, including tenderness over the dorsum of the nose.  A bilateral persistent nasal obstruction may also be present.

Complications

Potential complications of a nasal septal abscess include cavernous sinus thrombophlebitis, septal perforation, or saddle deformity due to cartilage necrosis.

Cause 

A nasal septal abscess is frequently a result of a secondary bacterial infection of a nasal septal hematoma.

Treatment

Treatment for a nasal septal abscess is similar to that of other bacterial infections. Aggressive broad spectrum antibiotics may be used after the infected area has been drained of fluids.

References 

Nose disorders